Eric James Cumming (23 December 1923 – 23 February 1964) was an Australian rules footballer who played with Footscray in the Victorian Football League (VFL) during the late 1940s.

Family
The son of Eric James Cumming (1890–1955), and Eleanor Jane "Ella" Cumming (1894–1986), née McKenzie, Eric James Cumming was born at Alexandra, Victoria on 23 December 1923.

He married Isabelle Woolley (1927–2015) on 19 June 1954.

Military service
Prior to his sporting exploits, Cumming enlisted in the Second AIF as a 19 year old, serving until the end of World War II.

Football
Cumming spent two seasons at Footscray, who were captain-coached by Arthur Olliver. He played eight games in the 1948 VFL season, including a Semi Final, which Footscray lost to Collingwood.

He played in six games in 1949, kicking his only career goals (two) in the match against Fitzroy, at the Brunswick Street Oval, on 21 May 1949. He sustained a serious thigh injury in the match against Collingwood, at Victoria Park, on 20 August 1949; he did not play football again.

Professional athletics
A professional sprinter, Cumming became the first and only Australian to win the prestigious New Year Sprint, at Powderhall Scotland in 1952. With a handicap of two yards, Cumming won the 130 yard race in 12.19 seconds. He also regularly competed in the Stawell Gift and finished second in 1946, behind Tommy Deane.

Death
He died at Ballarat on 23 February 1964.

Recognition
In recognition of his contribution to professional running, the Stawell Athletic Club awards the most successful sprinter over 70 m, 120 m, and 200 m, at its Easter Gift carnival, the Eric Cumming trophy.

Footnotes

References
 World War Two Nominal Roll: Private Eric James Cumming (VX133844), Department of Veterans' Affairs.
 World War Two Service Record: Private Eric James Cumming (VX133844), National Archives of Australia.

External links
 
 

1923 births
Western Bulldogs players
Australian rules footballers from Victoria (Australia)
Australian male sprinters
1964 deaths
Australian Army personnel of World War II
Australian Army soldiers